The Declaration on the Common Language ( / ) was issued in 2017 by a group of intellectuals and NGOs from Bosnia and Herzegovina, Croatia, Montenegro and Serbia who were working under the banner of a project called "Language and Nationalism". The Declaration states that Bosniaks, Croats, Montenegrins and Serbs have a common standard language of the polycentric type.

Before any public presentation, the Declaration was signed by over 200 prominent writers, scientists, journalists, activists and other public figures from the four countries. After being published, it has been signed by over 10,000 people from all over the region. The Declaration on the common language is an attempt to counter nationalistic factions. Its aim is to stimulate discussion on language without nationalism and to contribute to the reconciliation process.

Contents of the Declaration
The Declaration states that  Bosniaks, Croats, Montenegrins and Serbs have a common standard language of the polycentric type. It refers to the fact that the four peoples communicate effectively without an interpreter due to their mutual intelligibility, which is a key notion when talking about languages. Furthermore, it points out that the current language policy of emphasizing differences has led to a number of negative phenomena, and linguistic expression is imposed as a criterion of ethnonational affiliation and a means of affirming political loyalty. The Declaration states that language and people do not have to coincide, and that each state or nation may independently codify its own variant of the common language, and that the four standard variants enjoy equal status. The Declaration calls for abolishing all forms of linguistic segregation and discrimination in educational and public institutions. It also advocates for the freedom of individual choice and respect for linguistic diversity.

International project "Languages and nationalisms"
The Declaration followed the international project Languages and Nationalisms, (founded by two German foundations: Forum Ziviler Friedensdienst and Allianz Kulturstiftung), within which conferences were held in the four countries during 2016, thus providing an insight into the current situation and problems. The project was inspired by the book Language and Nationalism, and was organized by four non-governmental organizations from each of the countries included: P.E.N. Center Bosnia-Herzegovina from Sarajevo, the Association Kurs from Split, Krokodil from Belgrade and the Civic Education Center from Podgorica. An interdisciplinary series of expert conferences in Podgorica, Split, Belgrade and Sarajevo took place under participation of linguists, journalists, anthropologists and others. Numerous audiences were also included. The titles of debates on the conferences were:

The creation of the Declaration
More than thirty experts participated in the drafting of the Declaration, half of whom were linguists of different nationalities from the four states. The process of writing lasted for several months. The initiative emerged just after the last conference in Sarajevo, when young people from Bosnia-Herzegovina who experienced the educational segregation in the so-called "two schools under one roof" came up with the idea of composing a text that would encourage change of the language policy in all four countries. They entitled the text Declaration on the Common Language and gave it for rewriting to professional linguists, so that the Declaration was redrafted in Zagreb in the following months and can therefore be called the "Zagreb Declaration."

As a continuation of the project Languages and Nationalisms, a committee of experts of different nationalities from all four countries was formed that worked on the final version of the Declaration on 16 and 17 January 2017 in Zagreb. After the meeting, the text was sent to some twenty consultants, whose proposals are then embedded in the final form of the text.

Presentation of the Declaration

The Declaration on the common language with more than two hundred signatures of prominent intellectuals from Croatia, Montenegro, Bosnia-Herzegovina and Serbia was simultaneously presented to the public on 30 March 2017 in Zagreb, Podgorica, Belgrade and Sarajevo, where a press conference was held and two panel discussions with titles "What is a common language?" and "Language and the Future". Then the Declaration was opened for signing to other people. Over the next few days, more than 8.000 people signed it. Two months later, in the framework of the 10th Subversive Festival in Zagreb, a round table on the Declaration, titled "Language and Nationalism", was held. Then a debate "About the Declaration on the Common Language and Other Demons" was held at the Crocodile Literature Festival in Belgrade. After that, in Novi Sad, a panel discussion "Whose is Our Language?" at the Exit festival and a forum "What are the Achievements of the Declaration on the Common Language?" at the International Literary Conference Book Talk were organised. In Montenegro, there was a round table on the Declaration in the framework of the 7th Njegoš's Days. At the end of 2017, a discussion "What to do With the Language: Who speaks (or does not speak) the common language?" was organised at the 6th Open University in Sarajevo.

During 2018, a series of plenary lectures on the Declaration was held at conferences at the universities of various EU countries, and then at the universities in Japan. On the occasion of the second anniversary of the Declaration, two round tables were held: in Vienna "Language and Nationalisms: Do We Understand Each Other?" and in Zagreb "One Language or Several Languages: Discussion on the Declaration on the Common Language", organized by the Union of Student Associations of the Faculty of Philosophy in Zagreb, which later also organized a plenary lecture on the Declaration at the Faculty of Philosophy in Zagreb.

Text and signatories

Text
Source: Novosti

Signatories

The British sociolinguist Peter Trudgill notes that "linguists are well represented on the list of signatories." The most famous linguist "Noam Chomsky has signed the Declaration on the common language", which has been particularly resounding. The Declaration has been signed by "over fifty other linguists, including Anders Ahlqvist, Ronelle Alexander, Nadira Aljović, Bojan Anđelković, Boban Arsenijević, John Frederick Bailyn, Josip Baotić, Ranka Bijeljac-Babić, Ranko Bugarski, Vesna Bulatović, Daniel Bunčić, Costas Canakis, Greville Corbett, Oliver Czulo, Natalia Długosz, Ljiljana Dolamic, Nicholas Evans, Rajka Glušica, Radmila Gorup, Senahid Halilović, Camiel Hamans, Mirjana Jocić, Jagoda Jurić-Kappel, Dunja Jutronić, Dejan Karavesović, Jana Kenda, Ivan Klajn, Snježana Kordić, Svetlana Kurteš, Igor Kusin, Zineta Lagumdžija, Igor Lakić, Gordana Lalić-Krstin, Mia Mader Skender, Alisa Mahmutović, Olga Mišeska Tomić, Vladimir Miličić, Spiros Moschonas, Joachim Mugdan, Zoran Nikolovski, Miloš Okuka, Tatjana Paunović, Dušan-Vladislav Pažđerski, Mira Peter, Tanja Petrović, Enisa Pliska, Milena Podolšak, Luka Raičković, Katarina Rasulić, Marija Runić, Svenka Savić, Marko Simonović, Ljiljana Subotić, Danko Šipka, Dušanka Točanac, Neda Todorović, Aleksandar Trklja, Peter Trudgill, Mladen Uhlik, Hanka Vajzović, Vera Vasić, Elvira Veselinović, Đorđe Vidanović, Ana Ždrale, Jelena Živojinović."

Signatories of the Declaration include:

Greville Corbett

Ivana Bodrožić

Mirjana Karanović

Rajko Grlić

Željko Komšić

Svetislav Basara

Jurica Pavičić

Vedrana Rudan

Olja Savičević Ivančević

Dejan Jović

Igor Štiks

Nadežda Čačinovič

Ivan Ivanji

Lenka Udovički

Filip David

Ognjen Sviličić

Vladimir Arsenijević

Srećko Horvat

Rada Iveković

Štefica Galić

Pjer Žalica

Snježana Kordić

Dubravka Ugrešić

Ante Tomić

Noam Chomsky

Boris Dežulović

Dragan Markovina

Enver Kazaz

Viktor Ivančić

Oto Horvat

Maja Herman Sekulić

Tomislav Jakić

Željko Ivanković

Svetlana Lukić

Dejan Tiago Stanković

Nihad Hasanović

Srđan Srdić

Vesna Teršelič

Ivan Klajn

Borka Pavićević

Jasna Šamić

Slobodan Šnajder

Senahid Halilović

Daša Drndić

Edvin Kanka Ćudić

Rade Šerbedžija

Biljana Srbljanović

Dubravka Stojanović

Srđan Tešin

Isidora Žebeljan

Aleksandar Zograf

Mima Simić

Siniša Malešević

Rastko Močnik

Drago Pilsel

Peter Trudgill

Vladimir Veličković

Srbijanka Turajlić

Ermin Bravo

Nenad Veličković

Ranko Bugarski

Dritan Abazović

Izudin Bajrović

Jasmila Žbanić

Danko Šipka

Balša Brković

Asim Mujkić

Florian Bieber

Jasna Diklić

Vesna Pešić

Goran Marković

Vladislav Bajac

Stevan Filipović

Igor Kusin

Feđa Stojanović

Tatjana Bezjak

Dragoljub Mićunović

Stanislava Staša Zajović

Goran Dević

Miloš Okuka

Igor Galo

Faruk Šehić

Zvonimir Jurić

Nicholas Evans

Srđan Karanović

Zdravko Grebo

Lana Barić

Aleksandar Novaković

Maša Kolanović

Signatories about the Declaration
 
 
 
 
 
 
 
 
 
 
 
 
 
 
 
  min 19:34
 
 
 
 
 
 
 
  Alt URL min 84:14
 
 
  Alt URL
 
 
 
 
 
 

  min 17:36
 
 
 
 
 
 
  min 13:00
 
 
 
 
 
 
  Alt URL min 15:47

See also

 Serbo-Croatian language
 Illyrian (South Slavic)
 Sociolinguistics
 Novi Sad Agreement
 Vienna Literary Agreement
 Dialects of Serbo-Croatian
 Serbo-Croatian standard language
 Serbo-Croatian grammar
 Serbo-Croatian phonology
 Shtokavian
 Serbo-Croatian pluricentric language
 Croatian variant
 Serbian variant
 Bosnian variant
 Montenegrin variant
 Comparison of standard Bosnian, Croatian, Montenegrin and Serbian
 Language secessionism in Serbo-Croatian

Notes

a.  Participants: Borka Pavićević, Rajka Glušica and Snježana Kordić; Moderator: Sandra Zlotrg

b.  Participants: Ivana Bodrožić, Balša Brković and Asim Mujkić; Moderator: Igor Štiks

c.  Participants: Nerzuk Ćurak and Vladimir Arsenijević; Moderator: Žarka Radoja

d.  Participants: Tomislav Longinović, Viktor Ivančić, Snježana Kordić, Boris Buden and Mate Kapović; Moderator: Katarina Peović Vuković

e.  Participants: Teofil Pančić, Dragan Markovina, Snježana Kordić and Igor Štiks; Moderator: Vladimir Arsenijević and Ana Pejović

f.  Participants: Dragan Bjelogrlić, Snježana Kordić, Marko Šelić Marčelo, Vladimir Arsenijević and Vlatko Sekulović; Moderator: Milena Bogavac Minja

g.  Participants: Ivan Ivanji, Goran Miletić, Mirjana Đurđević, Srđan Tešin and Pero Zlatar; Moderator: Eržika Pap Reljin

h.  Participants: Rajka Glušica, Ivo Pranjković, Snježana Kordić, Ranko Bugarski, Vladimir Arsenijević and Svein Mønnesland; Moderator: Nikola Vučić

References

External links

 Text of the Declaration  
 List of signatories
  
  

Serbo-Croatian language
Petitions
Croatian documents
Serbian documents
2017 documents
Manifestos
Academic controversies
Sociolinguistics
Standard languages
South Slavic languages
Slavic studies
Education activism
Language activists
Language policy in Bosnia and Herzegovina, Croatia, Montenegro and Serbia
Protests in Croatia
Protests in Serbia
Protests in Bosnia and Herzegovina
Protests in Montenegro
Linguistic discrimination
Anti-nationalism in Europe
Croatian nationalism
Serbian nationalism
Bosnian nationalism
Croatian nationalism in Bosnia and Herzegovina
Montenegrin nationalism
Croatian culture
Serbian culture
Bosniak culture
Montenegrin culture
Linguistic controversies
Linguistic purism
Croatian language
Serbian language
Bosnian language
Montenegrin language
Naming controversies
Languages of Croatia
Languages of Serbia
Languages of Bosnia and Herzegovina
Languages of Montenegro
Comparison of Slavic languages
Projects in Europe
Projects established in 2016
2017 in Serbia
2017 in Croatia
2017 in Bosnia and Herzegovina
2017 in Montenegro